Empress Dowager Wang (c. 1594? – 1651), personal name unknown, formally known as Empress Dowager Xiaozheng, was an empress dowager of the Southern Ming dynasty of China. She was the main consort of Zhu Changying, Prince of Gui, the father of the Yongli Emperor. She converted to Roman Catholicism and adopted the name Helena.

She was the principal consort of Zhu Changying, and as such, she became the adoptive mother of his children with his other consorts.  After the fall of the Ming dynasty, she was asked to approve of the installation of her stepson Yongli Emperor as Ming emperor.  She gave her approval in November 1646, after which the Emperor could be enthroned. The Yongli Emperor showed his stepmother more influence than was considered necessary, and she acted as one of his principal advisers. It was said that she was: 
"...versed in letters, aware of current events, analytical about tasks and clear in her reasoning. After the Emperor assumed the throne there was nothing in which he did not follow her wishes."

She, along with the Emperor's biological mother and his consort, was converted to Catholicism by the Jesuit Andreas Xavier Koffler in April 1648.

References

Ming dynasty empresses dowager
Southern Ming empresses
1594 births
1651 deaths
Year of birth uncertain
People from Zhenjiang
Chinese Roman Catholics
Converts to Roman Catholicism
17th-century Chinese women
17th-century Chinese people